The Cristolțel is a left tributary of the river Solona in Romania. It discharges into the Solona near Surduc.

References

Rivers of Romania
Rivers of Sălaj County